Robert S. Ross (born April 9, 1954) is a professor of political science at Boston College, associate of the Fairbank Center for Chinese Studies at Harvard University, senior advisor of the security studies program at the Massachusetts Institute of Technology, and a member of the Council on Foreign Relations. He is one of the foremost American specialists on Chinese foreign and defense policy and U.S.-China relations.

Bibliography

 
 Great Wall and Empty Fortress: China's Search for Security (with Andrew J. Nathan); 1998
 Chinese Security Policy: Structure, Power, and Politics: 2009
 

As editor:

 China, the United States, and the Soviet Union: Tripolarity and Policy Making in the Cold War; 1993
 East Asia in Transition: Toward a New Regional Order; 1997
 After the Cold War: Domestic Factors and U.S.-China Relations; 1998
 Engaging China: The Management of an Emerging Power (with Alastair Iain Johnston); 1999
 Re-examining the Cold War: U.S.-China Diplomacy, 1954-1973 (with Changbin Jiang); 2001
 New Directions in the Study of China's Foreign Policy (with Alastair Iain Johnston); 2006
 China in the Era of Xi Jinping: Domestic and Foreign Policy Challenges (with Jo Inge Bekkevold); 2016.
 Strategic Adjustment and the Rise of China: Power and Politics in East Asia (with Øystein Tunsjø); 2017.

External links
Boston College bio
M.I.T. bio

1954 births
Living people
American political scientists
Boston College faculty
International relations scholars
Naval War College Review people
Political science educators
Political science writers